Abdelkader Firoud (October 11, 1919 in Oran, Algeria – April 3, 2005 in Nîmes, France), most commonly known as Kader Firoud, was a French-Algerian professional football midfielder and manager.

External links

Profile on French federation official site

1919 births
2005 deaths
Algerian emigrants to France
French footballers
France international footballers
Algerian footballers
Association football midfielders
USM Oran players
AS Saint-Étienne players
Nîmes Olympique players
Ligue 1 players
French football managers
Algerian football managers
Nîmes Olympique managers
Montpellier HSC managers
Footballers from Oran
Morocco national football team managers
Algeria national football team managers